Theodosius of Bithynia (c. 169 BCc. 100 BC) was a Greek astronomer and mathematician who wrote the Sphaerics, a book on the geometry of the sphere.

Life
Born in Tripolis, in Bithynia, Theodosius was mentioned by Strabo as among the residents of Bithynia distinguished for their learning, and one whose sons were also mathematicians. He was cited by Vitruvius as having invented a sundial suitable for any place on Earth.

His chief work, the Sphaerics, provided the mathematics for spherical astronomy, and may have been based on a work by Eudoxus of Cnidus. It is reasonably complete, and remained the main reference on the subject at least until the time of Pappus of Alexandria (4th century AD). The work was translated into Arabic in the 10th century, and then into Latin in the early 16th century, but these versions were faulty. Francesco Maurolico translated the works later in the 16th century.

In addition to the Sphaerics, two other works by Theodosius have survived: On Habitations, describing the appearances of the heavens at different climes and different times of the year, and On Days and Nights, a study of the apparent motion of the Sun. Both were published in Latin in the 16th century.

Notes

References
Ivor Bulmer-Thomas, "Theodosius of Bithynia," Dictionary of Scientific Biography 13:319–320. 
also on line  "Theodosius of Bithynia." Complete Dictionary of Scientific Biography. 2008. Encyclopedia.com. 25 Mar. 2015 .

Ancient Greek astronomers
Ancient Greek astrologers
Ancient Greek geometers
2nd-century BC Greek people
2nd-century BC writers
160s BC births
100s BC deaths
2nd-century BC mathematicians
2nd-century BC astronomers